Cyril Matthew Francois (20 June 1897 – 26 May 1944) was a South African cricketer who played in five Tests in 1922–23.

Francois was a right-handed batsman who began his first-class cricket career as a lower-order batsman but progressed to become a middle-order player and a right-arm fast-medium bowler.

He died in a motor accident near Pretoria in 1944.

References

External links
 
 Cyril Francois at CricketArchive

1897 births
1944 deaths
People from Lewisham
British emigrants to South Africa
South Africa Test cricketers
South African cricketers
Griqualand West cricketers
Road incident deaths in South Africa
South African Air Force personnel of World War II
South African military personnel killed in World War II